Ukraine competed at the World Games 2017  in Wroclaw, Poland, from 20 July 2017 to 30 July 2017.

Medalists

Main programme

Invitational sports

Competitors

Rhythmic Gymnastics
Ukraine  qualified at the 2017 World Games in:

Women's individual event - 1 quota

Trampoline
Ukraine  qualified at the 2017 World Games in:

Men's Individual Tumbling - 1 quota 
Men's Synchronized Trampoline - 1 quota
Women's Individual Tumbling - 1 quota
Women's Synchronized Trampoline - 1 quota

References

External links 
 Results in Acrobatic Gymnastics
 Results in Bowling
 Results in Finswimming
 Results in Indoor Rowing
 Results in Ju-Jitsu
 Results in Karate
 Results in Kickboxing
 Results in Muay Thai
 Results in Powerlifting
 Results in Sport climbing
 Results in Sumo

Nations at the 2017 World Games
2017 in Ukrainian sport
2017